Steven Earl McCatty (born March 20, 1954) is an American former professional baseball pitcher who played for the Oakland Athletics of Major League Baseball (MLB) from 1977 to 1985. He graduated from Troy High School in Troy, Michigan, in 1972.  He coached the Washington Nationals from 2009 through 2015.

Baseball career

Playing career
On August 10, 1980, McCatty pitched a 14-inning game against the Seattle Mariners, only to lose 2–1.

During the 1981 strike-shortened season, McCatty finished the season with a league leading 2.33 ERA, second in the American League to Sammy Stewart's 2.32 mark and was tied with three others for most wins with 14, including a league leading four shutouts, the last two of which were consecutive starts for McCatty. He also finished second for the Cy Young Award, behind Rollie Fingers.

However, McCatty would never even approach his 1981 form again. A number of baseball historians and statisticians blame this on manager Billy Martin overworking McCatty and the other members of the 1981 staff. In 2006, Rob Neyer estimated that McCatty threw 131 pitches per complete game in 1981, a heavy workload for a young pitcher even then. However, McCatty never blamed Martin for his post-1981 decline.

During a 1982 exhibition game against the San Diego Padres, McCatty stepped to the plate wielding a toy 15-inch bat but umpire Jim Quick would not allow him to hit. McCatty did this on orders from Martin, who was furious that the designated hitter rule was not allowed in National League ballparks, to use the toy bat as a protest.

Coaching career
After retiring as a player in 1986, McCatty remained in professional baseball working in radio and TV for the Oakland A's and with ESPN Major League Baseball. McCatty later moved on to coach several minor league baseball clubs, and was hired as pitching coach by the Detroit Tigers for the 2002 season. He subsequently coached for the Ottawa Lynx when it was the AAA affiliate of the Baltimore Orioles. During the offseason, McCatty works with youngsters of all ages to teach pitching mechanics at Jason Thompson Baseball in Auburn Hills, Michigan.

In 2009, McCatty became the second pitching coach in Washington Nationals franchise history, replacing Randy St. Claire, who was fired, and McCatty was called upon to replace him after working at the Nationals' AAA affiliate. The Nationals fired McCatty and the entire coaching staff after the 2015 season.

References

External links

Retrosheet

1954 births
Living people
American expatriate baseball players in Canada
American League wins champions
Baseball coaches from Michigan
Baseball players from Detroit
Buffalo Bisons (minor league) players
Chattanooga Lookouts players
Detroit Tigers coaches
Fort Myers Sun Sox players
Lewiston Broncs players
Major League Baseball broadcasters
Major League Baseball pitchers
Major League Baseball pitching coaches
Modesto A's players
Minor league baseball coaches
Oakland Athletics announcers
Oakland Athletics players
Ogden A's players
People from Troy, Michigan
San Jose Bees players
San Jose Missions players
Sportspeople from Detroit
Tucson Toros players
Vancouver Canadians players